Belgrano may refer to:

People
 Joaquín Belgrano (1773–1848), an Argentine patriot
 José Denis Belgrano (1844–1917), Spanish painter
 Joseph Belgrano (1762–1823), Argentine military officer and politician, brother of Manuel
 Manuel Belgrano (1770–1820), General Belgrano, Argentine politician and military leader
 Mario Belgrano (1884–1947), Argentine historian

Places

Argentina
 Belgrano, Buenos Aires, a neighbourhood of Buenos Aires
 Barrio Belgrano, Rosario, a neighbourhood of Rosario, Santa Fe Province
 Belgrano (Buenos Aires Underground), a station on the Buenos Aires Underground
 Belgrano River

Departments
 Belgrano Department, San Luis
 Belgrano Department, Santa Fe
 Belgrano Department, Santiago del Estero
 Doctor Manuel Belgrano Department, Jujuy Province

Elsewhere
 Belgrano I Base, an Argentine base in Antarctica
Belgrano II Base
Belgrano III Base
 Belgrano, Wales, a United Kingdom location

Ships
 , a French sail and steam liner
 , an Argentine Navy light cruiser sunk during the Falklands War
 , an Argentine Giuseppe Garibaldi-class cruiser

Sports
 Club Atlético Belgrano, an Argentine football club
 Defensores de Belgrano, Argentine football club
 General Belgrano de Santa Rosa, an Argentine football club 
 Belgrano Athletic Club, an Argentine rugby club 
 Club Manuel Belgrano, an Argentine rugby union and field hockey club

Other uses
 Belgrano (film), a 2010 Argentine film
 Plan Belgrano, 2015 infrastructure plan in Argentina
 University of Belgrano, a private university in the Belgrano district, Buenos Aires, Argentina
 2808 Belgrano, a minor planet

See also

General Belgrano (disambiguation)